White Birds Productions was a French video game developer. White Birds was founded by Benoît Sokal, Olivier Fontenay, Jean-Philippe Messian and Michel Bams in August 2003. White Birds specialised in adventure games but also handled other work, such as synthetic image creation, comics and merchandising.

The four founders had previously worked together at another French video game company, Microïds, producing Amerzone, Syberia and Syberia II. Microïds has since maintained connections with the company, for example by publishing Sinking Island.

White Birds Productions was based in the Paris suburb of Joinville-le-Pont (94) and employed 20 people. White Birds was a member of the PlayAll project, a middleware cross-platform created in collaboration with other game studios and university laboratories.

The company was shut down late 2010 due to financial problems mostly caused by a cancelled/unpaid for project.

Games 
White Birds primarily develop PC games, but they are also work with other consoles such as the Nintendo DS and the iPhone/iPod Touch.

PC

Nintendo DS

iPhone/iPod Touch/iPad

References

External links 
 

Defunct video game companies of France
Video game companies established in 2003
Video game companies disestablished in 2011